Boris Zoriktuyev (born 20 March 1949) is a Russian boxer. He competed in the men's flyweight event at the 1972 Summer Olympics.

References

1949 births
Living people
Russian male boxers
Olympic boxers of the Soviet Union
Boxers at the 1972 Summer Olympics
Flyweight boxers